Roland Everett Jayne (1886–1937) was a Methodist clergyman and  biographer. He is noted for two biographies:  Jonas Hanway: Philanthropist, Politician and Author (1929) and The Story of John Pounds, Founder of Ragged Schools (1925). He served as Methodist Minister in Portsmouth.

English Methodists
Clergy from Portsmouth
British biographers
1886 births
1937 deaths